On August 6, 1993, 22-year-old Fort Bragg soldier Kenneth Junior French, armed with two shotguns and a rifle, opened fire inside a Luigi's restaurant in Fayetteville, North Carolina, killing four people and injuring seven others. The case was featured in the 1997 documentary film Licensed to Kill.

Shooting
At around 10 p.m., French drove to the restaurant in a black truck. Wearing shorts and a fishing vest, French exited the truck carrying a pump-action shotgun. French then entered the restaurant through the kitchen at the back of the building and then began to yell about politics and homosexuality before opening fire indiscriminately, raising the death toll to four and the injured to seven. He was then shot and wounded by a police officer who was not on duty at the time of the shooting.

Victims 
The victims that were killed were:

- Wesley Scot Cover, 26

- James F. Kidd, 46

- Pete Parrous, 73 (the restaurant owner)

- Ethel Parrous, 65 (Pete's wife)

References

External links
 Gunman Who Killed Four in Restaurant Escapes Death Sentence
 LIFE TERM GIVEN IN 4 SLAYINGS
 Hero cop retires from Fayetteville police force
 26 YEARS LATER, FAYETTEVILLE MAN RECALLS DAY FORT BRAGG SOLDIER OPENED FIRE ON RESTAURANT, KILLING OWNERS
 FROM THE ARCHIVES: 26 years ago today, tragedy at Luigi's
 August 6, 1993: 'Thank God,' a policeman is remembered, 'he took him down'
 Deadly shootings bring back memories of Aug. 6, 1993, at Luigi's
 Fayetteville's infamous crimes, Part 2: Local cases that have garnered worldwide attention

1993 mass shootings in the United States
Attacks on restaurants in North America
Mass shootings in the United States
Mass shootings in North Carolina